Dreams on Fire is the first extended play by Australian rock group Boom Crash Opera. The EP was released in November 1991.

Track listing 
 "Holy Water" - 3:58
 "Hell to Pay" - 3:35
 "Skies Are Blue" - 4:36
 "Antarctica" - 5:06

 Tracks 2 and 3 recorded "live at the wireless" Triple J on 18 August 1991.

Charts

References 

Boom Crash Opera albums
1991 EPs
EPs by Australian artists